The Melikdom of Kashatagh (Armenian: Քաշաթաղի մելիքություն) was an Armenian melikdom (principality) which existed in the 15th–18th centuries. It was located along the Hakari River, on the southeastern section of the modern border of Armenia and Azerbaijan (approximately corresponds to the Kashatagh region of the Republic of Artsakh). The residences of the Meliks were located in the villages of Kashataghk and Khnatsakh, in the west of the present Lachin District of Azerbaijan and the east of the present Syunik region of Armenia respectively.

History 

The Melikdom of Kashatagh was founded at the end of the 15th century by Melik Haykaz I, also the founder of the Melik-Haykazyan dynasty (the youngest branch of the Armenian princely dynasty of Proshyan). Previously, the Kashatagh region was first ruled by the Orbelian family, and then by the Shahurnetsi clan.

According to historical evidence such as the accounts of Arakel of Tabriz, Melik Haykazyan, the first dynastic ruler of the melikdoms of Agachech-Kashatag (1450–1520), made Kashatghk his capital. The whole region was named Kashatagh after this princely residence. The Melik Haykaz Palace was built at the end of the 15th century on an artificial slope surrounded by a fortified wall with towers and gates. Being constructed in 1480, the complex is one of the earliest surviving examples of secular Armenian architecture.

Melik Haykaz I was succeeded by a son, Hakhnazar I. Hakhnazar died in 1551, his grave survived until the 1930s. The palace of Akhnazar in Khnatsakh has survived to this day.

The most prominent member of the dynasty was Melik Haykaz II, who was Melik from 1551 to 1623 and an active supporter of Iran during the Turkish-Persian wars for the possession of Transcaucasia. Arakel of Tabriz mentions him as one of the noble Armenians and advisers at the court of Shah of Iran Abbas I.

According to historian Morus Hasratyan, Haykaz II lived in exile in Iran for 10–15 years due to the Ottoman Empire's brutal policies during the temporary occupation of Transcaucasia in the 1580s or 90s. After the reconquest of the region by Iran in 1606–1607, Haykaz II, as one of the loyal supporters of the Shah, was not only restored to his rights but also received some possessions beyond its borders. A decree (ferman) of Shah Abbas I contains a list of the services provided by the Melik to Iranian authorities. The decree itself has no date, but the date of 999 of the Hijrah (1590/1591) exists on the seal used by Abbas I.

In 1699, Melik Emirbek of Kashatagh, son of Melik Martiros, participated in the Angeghakot Assembly where the Armenian meliks decided to authorize a delegation led by Melik Israel Ori to negotiate with the leaders of European powers such as Peter the Great on the liberation of historic Armenia.

The names of Haykaz I, Hakhnazar I, Haykaz II and their descendants are found in tombstones preserved on gravestones of the 16th – 18th centuries.
On behalf of the Melikdom of Kashatagh, which belonged to the Haykazyan family, a document written in Persian in 1691–92 was preserved. It includes the joint appeal of Melik Hakhnazar and his subordinate village headmen, addressed to the Shah's court. In the document, they appoint as their authorized representatives the son of melik Hakhnazar, Ilyas (Elias), and one of the elders, Hikor, who were supposed to present the problems arising in the region to the Shah's court and defend the interests of the local population.

The names of Melik Hakhnazar and his brother Haykaz (who is also mentioned in the document of 1691/92 as one of the witnesses) are marked in the inscription of 1682 on the facade of the entrance to the Church of the Holy Virgin in the village of Mirik of the Kashatagh region.

Demise
The Kashatagh Melikdom fell in the early 1730s. This began the onward demise of the Armenian population in the region as persecution of Armenians increased due to lack of self determination and Kurdish tribes were moved into the region from Iran as part of the resettlement policies of Shah Abbas I to fortify the borders of the Safavid Empire. It was later included in the Karabakh Khanate. Following the Russo-Persian Wars, this area would then become part of the Zangezur Uyezd of the Elisabethpol Governorate of the Russian Empire. By the time the Russians arrived, the indigenous Armenians of the region only had a significant population left in Lachin.

However, the Lachin villages were also subsequently abandoned by their Armenian population and the area became part of Red Kurdistan until 1929. Starting in the 1930s, this area was administered as a part of Soviet Azerbaijan until the First Nagorno-Karabakh War when Armenia occupied the region until the 2020 Nagorno-Karabakh War when it was returned to Azerbaijan.

Legacy

Kashatagh is home to 30 churches and chapels built between the 4th century and the beginning of the 18th century. Tsitsernavank Monastery is an example of Armenian Culture in the region. There are numerous Khachkars, palaces, and Armenian tombstones in the region which were left behind by the melikdom.

See also
Melikdoms of Karabakh

References 

Armenian principalities
Armenian Highlands
States and territories established in the 1470s
States and territories disestablished in the 1730s
Armenian kingdoms